The 2022 Italian general election took place on 25 September 2022. In its two single-seat constituencies, Aosta Valley elected Franco Manes (Valdostan Union within the Aosta Valley coalition) to the Chamber of Deputies and Nicoletta Spelgatti (Lega Vallée d'Aoste within the centre-right coalition) to the Senate of the Republic. Spelgatti, a former president of Aosta Valley, was the first Valdostan woman elected to the Senate.

Results
Chamber of Deputies

Senate

Notes

See also
2022 Italian general election in Trentino-Alto Adige/Südtirol
Results of the 2022 Italian general election

References

2022 elections in Italy
Elections in Aosta Valley
September 2022 events in Italy